Colonel Chabert is a 1920 German silent historical film directed by and starring Eugen Burg. It is an adaptation of Honoré de Balzac's 1832 novel Colonel Chabert.

Cast
 Eugen Burg as Oberst Chabert
 Wanda Treumann as Doppelrolle
 Oskar Marion
 
 Max Laurence

References

Bibliography

External links

1920 films
Films of the Weimar Republic
German silent feature films
Films directed by Eugen Burg
German black-and-white films
1920s historical drama films
Napoleonic Wars films
Films set in the 1810s
Films based on works by Honoré de Balzac
Films based on French novels
German historical drama films
1920 drama films
Silent historical drama films
1920s German films
1920s German-language films